Działki  is a village in the administrative district of Gmina Wiskitki, within Żyrardów County, Masovian Voivodeship, in eastern Poland.

References

Villages in Żyrardów County